Kropotkin Range is a mountain range in Bodaybinsky District, Irkutsk Oblast, Russian Federation. The settlements of Kropotkin and Artyomovsky are located in the area of the range.

History
In the course of the 1901 exploration of the Lena Goldfields led by Vladimir Obruchev, the area was first explored, studied, topographically photographed and mapped by Russian geologist and topographer Pavel Preobrazhensky. He named the mountain range in honor of Peter Kropotkin in 1902.

Geography

The slopes of the Kropotkin Range are dissected by wide river valleys. The range summits are generally rounded and of moderate height.

Hydrography
The Zhuya river, a left tributary of the Chara, has its sources in the eastern slopes and limits the range in its southeastern section. From the southern slopes originate a few right tributaries of the Vitim, all of them small and short, such as the Takhtiga. In the northern slopes are the sources of some left tributaries of the upper course of the Bolshoy Patom, such as the Anangra and Mara.

Flora 
The lower slopes of the range are mainly covered by pine and larch taiga, with mountain tundra and band thickets of dwarf cedar at higher elevations.

See also
List of mountains and hills of Russia

References

External links
Семья поднялась на хребет Кропоткина за посланием 30-летней давности
Mountain ranges of Russia
Mountains of Irkutsk Oblast
South Siberian Mountains

ceb:Khrebet Kropotkina (kabukiran sa Rusya, Irkutskaya Oblast')
pl:Góry Kropotkina
ru:Хребет Кропоткина (Патомское нагорье)